Wasquehal Football is a French football club based in Wasquehal.

History and mergers
The club was founded in 1924 as L'Union Sportive de Wasquehal. It was known as Entente Sportive de Wasquehal in 1945, when it merged with L'Association Sportive de Wasquehal (founded in 1931). In 2017, it merged further with Wasquehal Futsal Club and took on the current name.

The club held professional status between 1997 and 2004, playing in Ligue 2 from 1997 until 2003.

As of the 2020–21 season, the club plays in Championnat National 3, after securing promotion from Régional 1 in 2020.

Stadium
The team plays home matches at a minor pitch at the Stadium Lille Metropole in Villeneuve-d'Ascq. In recent years they played at the main stadium but following their relegation from the French National League local rivals Lille OSC have been left as the sole tenants.

Achievements
France Championnat de France Amateur 2 champion (Group D) 2015
France Division 3 runner-up 1997
France Division 4 champion 1995
France DH North champion 1988
France League 2, 2001 – 13th position (all-time league high)

References

Wasquehal
Association football clubs established in 1924
1924 establishments in France
Wasquehal Football
Sport in Nord (French department)
Football clubs in Hauts-de-France